The Minister of Urban Affairs and Spatial Planning of the Republic of Guinea  (Ministère de la Ville et de l'Aménagement du territoire) is a Guinean ministry whose minister is Ousmane Gaoual Diallo.

Officeholders since 2010

References 

Politics of Guinea
Government ministries of Guinea